| tries            = {{#expr:
 + 5 + 3 + 2 + 2 + 2 + 4 + 2
 + 1 + 1 + 5 + 5 + 4 + 6 + 4
 + 4 + 1 + 5 + 2 + 6 + 4 + 1
 + 6 + 7 + 7 + 3 + 6 + 9 + 3
 + 3 + 3 + 1 + 3 + 1 + 3 + 2
 + 2 + 6 + 1 + 4 + 3 + 5 + 6
 + 3 + 3 + 4 + 1 + 4 + 2 + 3
 + 3 + 1 + 6 + 0 + 2 + 3 + 2
 + 1 + 3 + 4 + 8 + 2 + 2 + 5
+ 3 + 5 + 5 + 3 + 4 + 1 + 1
+ 0 + 2 + 2 + 1 + 1 + 1 + 4
+ 2 + 8 + 1 + 8 + 2 + 0 + 1
+ 5 + 7 + 3 + 1 + 2 + 5 + 1
+ 0 + 5 + 4 + 0 + 2 + 6 + 1
+ 3 + 5 + 5 + 3 + 9 + 1 + 1
+ 2 + 0 + 0 + 0 + 3 + 1 + 1
+ 0 + 2 + 4 + 4 + 3 + 4
+ 0 + 7 + 2 + 2 + 3 + 5 + 0
+ 1 + 3 + 2 + 6 + 1 + 2
+ 0 + 1 + 8 + 7 + 3 + 8 + 0
+ 2 + 3 + 3 + 4 + 2 +10 + 5
+ 5
+ 5 + 4 + 2 + 3 + 2 + 2 + 7
+ 6 + 3 + 5 + 9 + 5 + 5 + 3
  + 2
+ 1 + 3 + 3 + 6 + 1 + 6 + 1
+ 2 + 1 + 4 + 2 + 7 + 1 + 7
+ 3 +10 + 3 + 2 + 6 + 3 + 7
+ 1 + 2 + 1 + 2 + 1 
}}
| top point scorer =  Gaëtan Germain (Brive)299 points
| top try scorer   = 15 tries
| website          = www.lnr.fr
| prevseason       = 2012–13
| nextseason       = 2014–15
}}
The 2013–14 Top 14 competition is a French domestic rugby union club competition operated by the Ligue Nationale de Rugby (LNR). Two new teams from the 2012–13 Pro D2 season were promoted to Top 14 this year, Oyonnax and Brive in place of the two relegated teams, Agen and Mont-de-Marsan. Home-and-away play began on 16 August 2013 and continued through to 3 May 2014.

The regular season was very closely fought, with a record few away wins, but ended up with the same six teams qualifying for the play-offs as the previous year. Toulon topped the table for the first time, one point clear of second-placed Montpellier, whilst defending champions Castres just managed to hold on to the last qualifying spot, finishing in sixth. At the other end of the table, Biarritz had a nightmarish season, spending virtually the whole year in the relegation zone, and finished bottom, while Perpignan, who had been in the top tier of French rugby since 1911, were also relegated. Oyonnax and Brive finished 12th and 9th, respectively, marking the first time since 2007 that both newly promoted teams managed to keep their places in the Top 14.

The quarter-final stage saw two major upsets, with Racing Métro avenging their loss from the previous year with a 21–16 away win at Toulouse, whose run of twenty consecutive semi-final appearances thus came to end, while Castres put an end to Clermont's record streak of 77 straight wins at Stade Marcel-Michelin with a 22–16 win. This is the first time that both quarterfinals have resulted in away wins.

Teams

Competition format
The top six teams at the end of the regular season (after all the teams played one another twice, once at home, once away) enter a knockout stage to decide the Champions of France.  This consists of three rounds: the teams finishing third to sixth in the table play quarter-finals (hosted by the third and fourth placed teams).  The winners then face the top two teams in the semi-finals, with the winners meeting in the final at Stade de France.

The LNR uses a slightly different bonus points system from that used in most other rugby competitions. It trialled a new system in 2007–08 explicitly designed to prevent a losing team from earning more than one bonus point in a match, a system that also made it impossible for either team to earn a bonus point in a drawn match. LNR chose to continue with this system for subsequent seasons.

France's bonus point system operates as follows:

 4 points for a win.
 2 points for a draw.
 1 bonus point for winning while scoring at least 3 more tries than the opponent. This replaces the standard bonus point for scoring 4 tries regardless of the match result.
 1 bonus point for losing by 7 points (or less).

Table

Relegation
Normally, the teams that finish in 13th and 14th places in the table are relegated to Pro D2 at the end of the season.  In certain circumstances, "financial reasons" may cause a higher placed team to be demoted instead.  This last happened at the end of the 2009–10 season when 12th place Montauban were relegated thereby reprieving 13th place Bayonne.

Fixtures & Results
After the General Assembly of the Ligue Nationale de Rugby, held at Aix-en-Provence on 5 and 6 July 2013, the outline calendar of fixtures for the 2013–14 season were released.  Detailed fixtures information evolves as the season progresses (i.e. specific kick off times).  Match attendances are from the official web site (Affluences).

Round 1

Round 2

Round 3

Round 4

Round 5

Round 6

Round 7

Round 8

Round 9

Round 10

Round 11

Round 12

Round 13

Round 14

Round 15

Round 16

Round 17

 This match was postponed due to heavy rain.  Despite the pitch being covered since Friday, the referee took the decision to cancel the match.  It has been rescheduled to 14 March.

Round 18

Round 19

 This match was postponed due to a waterlogged pitch.  It has been rescheduled to 5 April.

Round 20

Round 21

Round 17 rescheduled match

 This match – originally scheduled to be played on 25 January 2014 – was postponed due to heavy rain.

Round 22

Round 23

 This result means that Biarritz Olympique will finish the season at the bottom of the table.

Round 19 rescheduled match

 This match – originally scheduled to be played on 15 February 2014 – was postponed due to a waterlogged pitch.

Round 24

Round 25

Round 26

Playoffs
   
  
All times are in Central European Summer Time (UTC+2).

Quarter-finals

Semi-finals

Final

Top scorers
Note: Flags to the left of player names indicate national team as has been defined under IRB eligibility rules, or primary nationality for players who have not yet earned international senior caps. Players may hold one or more non-IRB nationalities.

Top points scorers

Top try scorers

Attendances

 Attendances do not include the semi-finals or final as these are at neutral venues.

Notes

References

See also
2013–14 Rugby Pro D2 season
List of 2013-2014 Top 14 transfers

External links

  Ligue Nationale de Rugby – Official website
  Midi Olympique
 Top 14 on ESPN Scrum
 Top 14 on Planet Rugby

 
Top 14 seasons
 
France